Edward Joseph Donofrio  (born September 1, 1951) is an American fencer. Born in Brooklyn, New York, he competed in the individual and team foil events at the 1976 Summer Olympics.USA Fencing Hall of Fame Class of 2023.

References

External links
 

1951 births
Living people
American male foil fencers
Olympic fencers of the United States
Fencers at the 1976 Summer Olympics
Sportspeople from Brooklyn
Pan American Games medalists in fencing
Pan American Games silver medalists for the United States
Fencers at the 1979 Pan American Games